The 2013 TCU Horned Frogs football team represented Texas Christian University (TCU) in the 2013 NCAA Division I FBS football season. Playing as a member of the Big 12 Conference (Big 12), the team was led by head coach Gary Patterson, in his 13th year, and played its home games at Amon G. Carter Stadium in Fort Worth, Texas.

Coaching staff

Schedule 

 Schedule source:

Game summaries

vs. LSU

Southeastern Louisiana

@ Texas Tech

SMU

@ Oklahoma

Kansas

This was TCU's first conference win at home since joining the Big 12 in 2012.  The three conference games won in their inaugural Big 12 season were all on the road.

@ Oklahoma State

Texas

West Virginia

@ Iowa State

@ Kansas State

Baylor

Ranking

References

TCU
TCU Horned Frogs football seasons
TCU Horned Frogs football